Avec Matisse à Tanger (English: With Matisse in Tangier) is a 1993 Moroccan documentary film directed by Moumen Smihi.

Synopsis 
The film chronicles Henri Matisse's travels to Tangier as he seeks new motifs for his paintings from a Moroccan perspective.

References

External links 
 

1993 documentary films
1993 films
Moroccan documentary films
1990s Arabic-language films